Events from the year 1990 in Finland

Incumbents 
 President: Mauno Koivisto
 Prime Minister: Harri Holkeri
 Speaker: Kalevi Sorsa

Events
 9 September - Joint news conference of President Bush and Soviet President Mikhail Gorbachev in Helsinki, Finland.

Births 
4 June - Ville Mäkilä, Finnish former professional football player

See also 
History of Finland

References 

 
1990s in Finland
Finland
Finland
Years of the 20th century in Finland